Tamar Debora Ziegler (born 1971) is an Israeli mathematician known for her work in ergodic theory,  combinatorics and number theory. She holds the Henry and Manya Noskwith Chair of Mathematics at the Einstein Institute of Mathematics at the Hebrew University.

Career

Ziegler received her Ph.D. in Mathematics from the Hebrew University under the supervision of Hillel Furstenberg. Her thesis title was “Non conventional ergodic averages”. She spent five years in the US as a postdoc at the Ohio State University, the Institute for Advanced Study at Princeton, and the University of Michigan. She was a faculty member at the Technion during the years 2007–2013, and joined the Hebrew University in the Fall of 2013 as a full professor. 

Ziegler serves as an editor of several journals. Among others she is an editor of the Journal of the European Mathematical Society (JEMS), an associate editor of the Annals of Mathematics, and the Editor in Chief of the Israel Journal of Mathematics.

Research
Ziegler’s research lies in the interface of ergodic theory with several mathematical fields including combinatorics, number theory, algebraic geometry and theoretical computer science. One of her major contributions, in joint work with Ben Green and Terence Tao (and combined with earlier work of theirs), is the resolution of the generalized Hardy–Littlewood conjecture for affine linear systems of finite complexity.

Other important contributions include the generalization of the Green-Tao theorem to polynomial patterns, and the proof of the inverse conjecture for the Gowers norms in finite field geometry.

Recognition
Ziegler won the Erdős Prize of the Israel Mathematical Union in 2011, and the Bruno memorial award in 2015. She was the European Mathematical Society lecturer of the year in 2013, and an invited speaker at the 2014 International Congress of Mathematicians. She was named MSRI Simons Professor for 2016-2017. 

She was elected to the Academia Europaea in 2021.

References

Year of birth missing (living people)
Living people
Einstein Institute of Mathematics alumni
Academic staff of Technion – Israel Institute of Technology
Academic staff of the Hebrew University of Jerusalem
21st-century Israeli  mathematicians
University of Michigan people
21st-century women mathematicians
Members of Academia Europaea
Erdős Prize recipients